Así nomás is a 2016 Peruvian comedy film written and directed by Willy Combe, and starring Renzo Schuller, Franco Cabrera and Emilram Cossio. It premiered on July 28, 2016, in Peruvian theaters.

Synopsis 
Three friends decide to make a zombie movie with no money, and they have to figure out how to do it. This is how they come to obtain a surprising result: a film to laugh from beginning to end and that leaves a lesson in overcoming life's obstacles.

Cast 
The actors participating in this film are:

 Renzo Schuller as Víctor
 Franco Cabrera as Orestes
 Emilram Cossio as Jairo
 Pold Gastello
 Óscar López Arias
 Katia Palma
 Sheyla Rojas

Reception 
Así nomás drew 54,999 viewers in its three weeks in theaters.

References 

2016 films
2016 comedy films
Peruvian comedy films
2010s Spanish-language films
2010s Peruvian films
Films set in Peru
Films shot in Peru
Films about films
Films about friendship